The Valentino Fashion Group is an Italian consortium of luxury fashion companies. 

In 2002 the fashion house Valentino was purchased by the Marzotto Group, joining a group that included Hugo Boss, and licensed products for Gianfranco Ferre, M Missoni, and MCS Marlboro Classics. In 2005, Marzotto spun off Valentino and its other fashion brands into the Valentino Fashion Group. As a result of the Takeover Bid made in the second half of 2007, Valentino Fashion Group S.p.A. passed under the control of the private equity fund Permira. Until 23 December 2009 there were three business units, which even included Hugo Boss, a company which was relinquished on that date and therefore no longer a part of the consolidated group. On 11 July 2012, Mayhoola for Investments, sustained by a large private group from Qatar, purchased Valentino and the M Missoni licence, while MCS Marlboro Classics remains the property of Red & Black, a company indirectly owned by the Permira funds in partnership with the Marzotto family.

References

External links
 

Valentino Fashion Group
Clothing companies of Italy
Italian companies established in 2005
Clothing companies established in 2005
Design companies established in 2005
Multinational companies headquartered in Italy
Companies based in Milan

 Corporate information on https://www.valentino.com/en-us/experience/corporate-information